SeaMonkey is a free and open-source Internet suite. It is the continuation of the former Mozilla Application Suite, based on the same source code, which itself grew out of Netscape Communicator and formed the base of Netscape 6 and Netscape 7.

SeaMonkey was created in 2005 after the Mozilla Foundation decided to focus on the standalone projects Firefox and Thunderbird. The development of SeaMonkey is community-driven, in contrast to the Mozilla Application Suite, which until its last released version (1.7.13) was governed by the Mozilla Foundation. The new project-leading group is called the SeaMonkey Council.

Compared to Firefox, the SeaMonkey web browser keeps the more traditional-looking interface of Netscape and the Mozilla Application Suite, most notably the XUL architecture. This allows the user to extend SeaMonkey by modifying add-ons for Thunderbird or the add-ons that were formerly compatible with Firefox before the latter switched to WebExtensions.

Components
SeaMonkey consists of a web browser, which is a descendant of the Netscape family, an e-mail and news client program (SeaMonkey Mail & Newsgroups, which shares code with Mozilla Thunderbird), an HTML editor (SeaMonkey Composer) and an IRC client (ChatZilla). The software suite supports skins. It comes with two skins in the default installation, Modern and Classic.

Mail

SeaMonkey Mail is a traditional e-mail client that includes support for multiple accounts, junk mail detection, message filters, HTML message support, and address books, among other features. It shares code with Mozilla Thunderbird; both Thunderbird and SeaMonkey are built from Mozilla's comm-central source tree.

Composer

SeaMonkey Composer is a WYSIWYG HTML editor descended from Mozilla Composer. Its main user interface features four tabs: Normal (WYSIWYG), HTML tags, HTML code, and browser preview. The generated code is HTML 4.01 Transitional.

Naming
To avoid confusing organizations that still want to use the original Mozilla Application Suite, the new product needed a new name. After initial speculation by members of the community, a July 2, 2005 announcement confirmed that SeaMonkey would officially become the name of the Internet suite superseding the Mozilla Application Suite.

"Seamonkey" (with a lowercase "m") refers to brine shrimp and had been used by Netscape and the Mozilla Foundation as a code name for the never-released Netscape Communicator 5 and later the Mozilla Application Suite itself. Originally, the name "Seamonkey" was derived by Netscape management to replace "Buttmonkey", which their developers had chosen following an internal contest for the codename.

The SeaMonkey Council has now trademarked the name with help from the Mozilla Foundation. The project uses a separate numbering scheme, with the first release being called SeaMonkey 1.0. Despite having a different name and version number, SeaMonkey 1.0 is based on the same code as Mozilla Application Suite 1.7.

For trademark and copyright reasons, Debian rebranded SeaMonkey and distributed it as Iceape until 2013.

History
On March 10, 2005, the Mozilla Foundation announced that it would not release any official versions of Mozilla Application Suite beyond 1.7.x, since it had now focused on the standalone applications Firefox and Thunderbird. However, the Foundation emphasized that it would still provide infrastructure for community members who wished to continue development. In effect, this meant that the suite would still continue to be developed, but now by the SeaMonkey Council instead of the Mozilla Foundation.

SeaMonkey was first released on September 15, 2005. SeaMonkey 1 was released on January 30, 2006.

Core Mozilla project source code was licensed under a disjunctive tri-license (before changing to MPL 2.0) that gave the choice of one of the three following sets of licensing terms: Mozilla Public License, version 1.1 or later, GNU General Public License, version 2.0 or later, GNU Lesser General Public License, version 2.1 or later.

Release history
Parts of this table are based on the SeaMonkey release notes, the roadmap and the meeting notes.

See also

Comparison of Internet Relay Chat clients
Comparison of Usenet newsreaders
Java Embedding Plugin
List of free and recommended Mozilla WebExtensions
List of Usenet newsreaders
Mozilla Composer
Timeline of web browsers
 K-Meleon
 Pale Moon

References

External links

Mozilla Foundation (March 10, 2005). Mozilla Application Suite - Transition Plan. Retrieved March 10, 2005.
MozillaZine (June 6, 2005). Community Mozilla Application Suite Project Not Renamed Yet. Retrieved June 6, 2005.
Adot's Notblog (June 6, 2005). It's not a renaming and it's not official. Retrieved June 20, 2005.
SeaMonkey Council (July 2, 2005). SeaMonkey Project Continues Internet Suite. Retrieved July 3, 2005.

The SeaMonkey Project
SeaMonkey Wiki

2006 software
Free HTML editors
Free Internet suites
Free software programmed in C++
Free Usenet clients
Free web browsers
Gecko-based software
Gopher clients
HTML editors
MacOS web browsers
Mozilla
Mozilla Application Suite
OS/2 web browsers
Portable software
POSIX web browsers
Software that uses SQLite
Software that uses XUL
Software using the Mozilla license
Web browsers based on Firefox
Windows web browsers